Hyun-seok, also spelled Hyun-suk, is a Korean masculine given name. The meaning differs based on the hanja used to write each syllable of the name. There are 35 hanja with the reading "hyun" and 20 hanja with the reading "seok" on the South Korean government's official list of hanja which may be used in given names.

People with this name include:
Dae Hyeonseok (fl. 871–895), King of Balhae
Bang Hyeon-seok (born 1961), South Korean writer
Noh Hyun-suk (born 1966), South Korean handball player
Kim Hyun-seok (footballer) (born 1967), South Korean football player
Yang Hyun-suk (born 1970), South Korean entertainment executive, former member of boy band Seo Taeji and Boys
Kim Hyun-seok (filmmaker) (born 1972), South Korean film director and screenwriter
Yun Hyon-seok (1984–2003), South Korean LGBT activist
Choi Hyun-suk (born 1999), member of South Korean boy band Treasure

See also
List of Korean given names

References

Korean masculine given names